Otter Creek is a stream in Macon, Monroe and Shelby counties in the U.S. state of Missouri. It is a tributary of the North Fork of the Salt River.

The stream flows southeast passing under Missouri Route 151 and between the communities of Enterprise and Maud and enters Monroe County. The stream continues to the southeast past the town of Granville and on under Missouri Route 15 three miles north of Paris.

Otter Creek was so named on account of otters in the stream.

See also
List of rivers of Missouri

References

Rivers of Macon County, Missouri
Rivers of Monroe County, Missouri
Rivers of Shelby County, Missouri
Rivers of Missouri